Śliwno may refer to the following places:
Śliwno, Greater Poland Voivodeship (west-central Poland)
Śliwno, Podlaskie Voivodeship (north-east Poland)
Śliwno, West Pomeranian Voivodeship (north-west Poland)